FC Baku is an Azerbaijani football club based in Baku that has been an amateur club since 2016. Prior to that, Baku played 18 seasons in the Azerbaijan Premier League, winning the championship twice and earning the National Cup three times. The club ceased operations in 2018.

History

Early years (1997–2004)
Led by Shamil Heydarov, Dinamo finished 2nd and entered UEFA Cup 1998-99 season but was eliminated by Argeş Piteşti, 1:7 on aggregate, in Preliminary round. 1997–98 season Dinamo participated with new head coach. Under the manage of Ruslan Abdullayev, the team passed the first part of tournament distance well, although 3rd place and 52 points were not enough for medals or European cups, and Dinamo completed the season at 6th place. Two following season Dinamo also finished 6th, but since 2000, the team was managed by Ruslan Abdullayev's son Elkhan Abdullayev, and was renamed into Dinamo Bakılı. In 2001–02 season, after a disastrous performance, Dinamo Bakılı relegated to Azerbaijan First Division, but due to conflict between clubs and the AFFA next championship was held just two years later, in which the team participated under the name of Dinamo, last time in its history.

Success era (2004–2008)
In 2004, club renamed to the FC Baku, after changes by the new chairman. New management began from radical changes. Elkhan Abdullayev was replaced by Asgar Abdullayev immediately after the first defeat on second week. Azerbaijan national football team former manager was able to establish the team playing style. FC Baku gained some important victories over the opponents and was holding a pole position until February 2005. At the end of the season Asgar Abdullayev concentrated on Azerbaijan Cup, where his team reached the Final game. In 2004–05 season, Baku managed to finish at 5th position.

But the returning to European cups proved unsuccessful. In UEFA Cup 2004-05 season first qualifying match, Baku was beaten by Slovakian side MŠK Žilina, 2–3 on aggregate, although they won a first leg in Baku, 1–0.

In 2008, after poor first season, the club celebrated their second title with Gjoko Hadžievski. Under his charge, FC Baku became the first Azerbaijani team to qualify to the third qualifying round of the UEFA Champions League. The team passed Ekranas in the second qualifying round after 2–2 in Lithuania and 4–2 win in Tofik Bakhramov Stadium in the second leg.

Downfall and financial struggles (2008–2018)
In 2010, the club was handed a two-match suspension by UEFA for fielding Joël Epalle, who was ineligible to play at the time despite winning both legs against Budućnost.

A long period of decline followed the success of the 2008 to the end of the decade. Despite the appointment of famous names such as Bülent Korkmaz, Winfried Schäfer, Aleksandrs Starkovs, Božidar Bandović and Milinko Pantić, the club did not achieve any success and squandered large sums of money on unsuccessful signings.

In 2014, the club owner Hafiz Mammadov's financial difficulties forced number of players and personnel to seek new clubs, leaving club's future uncertain. The club was eliminated from the Premier League during the 2014-15 season. Over the course of the 2015-16 season the team played in the Azerbaijani First Division, and became defunct as a professional club the next year.

Colours and logo
The club's traditional kit is a white and blue shirt, white shorts with grey socks. Their away kit is all maroon. Baku's kits are manufactured by Macron. The club sponsored by the Baghlan Group and ZQAN Holding. The club's logo is based on The Maiden Tower, a noted landmark and one of Azerbaijan's most distinctive emblems.

Stadium
Tofik Bakhramov Stadium was used for long period of time as Baku's main stadium. In 2008, Baku's president Hafiz Mammadov announced that a new stadium which will have a capacity of 10,000 fans will be built. The new stadium was expected to be finish 2010, but construction is currently on hold.

The club's training base is currently used for its domestic games, which holds 2,000 fans.

Supporters
The club enjoys support from fans scattered all over the city, and the local area in general. The club has been the subject of an independent supporters' fanzine Toplu Bakı since the 2010s.

League and domestic cup history

Post-independence period

European record
As of 21 July 2009.

Notable managers

The following managers have all won at least one trophy when in charge of FC Baku:

Honours
Azerbaijan League
Champions (2): 2005–06, 2008–09

Azerbaijan Cup
Winners (3): 2004–05, 2009–10, 2011–12

References

External links

Official website
FK Baku at UEFA.COM
FK Baku at EUFO.DE
FK Baku at Weltfussball.de
FK Baku at Football-Lineups.com

 
Defunct football clubs in Azerbaijan
Association football clubs established in 1997
Association football clubs disestablished in 2018
Football clubs in Baku
1997 establishments in Azerbaijan
2018 disestablishments in Azerbaijan